Pilsbryspira auberti is a species of sea snail, a marine gastropod mollusk in the family Pseudomelatomidae, the turrids and allies.

Description
The length of the shell attains 29 mm.

Distribution
This species occurs in the Pacific Ocean off Colón, Panama.

References

 Lamy, Ed., 1934. Coquilles marines recueillies par M. E. Aubert de Rüe dans l'Amérique du Sud. Bulletin du Muséum d'Histoire naturelle 6: 432-435

External links
 
 http://www.gastropods.com/0/Shell_41120.shtml Gastropods.com: Pilsbryspira auberti]

auberti
Gastropods described in 1934